Xyroptila ruvenzori is a moth of the family Pterophoridae. It is found in Uganda (the Ruvenzori Range).

References

External links

Moths described in 2006
Endemic fauna of Uganda
Moths of Africa
ruvenzori